Mark Alexander Lever is a microbial ecologist who studies the role of microorganisms in the global carbon cycle. He is a professor of environmental microbiology  in the Department of Environmental Systems Science in the Institute of Biogeochemical and Pollutant Dynamics at ETH Zurich.

Biography
Mark A. Lever earned his MA in Marine Biology at the Boston University Marine Program at Woods Hole in 2002 and his PhD in Marine Sciences at the University of North Carolina, Chapel Hill in 2008. He worked as a postdoctoral scientist at Aarhus University from 2009 to 2014, when he joined the faculty of ETH Zurich. Lever is a member of the Deep Life Scientific Steering Committee and Synthesis Group 2019 for the Deep Carbon Observatory and is an associate editor for Frontiers in Microbiology.

In his research, Mark A. Lever investigates the factors that determine the presence, abundance, community composition, metabolism, and activity of microorganisms in aquatic sediments and in the Earth's crust.  
 In 2013 he discovered that microbes survive deep in the oceanic crust by living off of chemical energy released by water-rock reactions. In addition, his research group is investigating the impact of macrofaunal bioturbation on microbial community structure and microbial carbon cycling, the ecological and physiological strategies of microbial life inhabiting long-term energy-limited environments, and the potential for sediments to serve as genetic archives of past environmental change.

References

Further reading 

Universe Today 

Living people
1977 births
American ecologists
Academic staff of ETH Zurich